Chahar Mahaal and Bakhtiari's codes are 71 and 81. In public cars, Taxis and Governal cars the letter is always the same. But in simple cars this letter (ب) depends on the city.

71
71 is Shahrekord county's code and all of the letters are for Shahrekord.

81

Road transport in Iran
Transportation in Chaharmahal and Bakhtiari Province